Ali Haider Noor Khan Niazi (Punjabi)(born 15 December 1978), is a Pakistani politician. He is the member of Punjab Provincial Assembly since general elections 2008.

Education 
Ali Haider was born in Mianwali on December 15, 1978. He did Master in the Political science from the University of the Punjab, Lahore.

Political career 
He had been Naib Nazim of Tehsil council during 2000–01. He elected in 2008 general elections on the seat of Provincial Assembly and succeeded. He belongs to the party Muttahida Majlis-e-Amal (MMA). He now belongs to the party Pakistan Muslim League ( N )

.

References 

Living people
1978 births
Pashtun people
People from Mianwali District
Ali Haider Noor Khan Niazi
University of the Punjab alumni